is a passenger railway station located in the city of Shimanto, Kōchi Prefecture, Japan. It is operated by the third-sector Tosa Kuroshio Railway, whose headquarters is located in the station building. The station is numbered "TK-40".

Lines and services

The station is also served by two JR Shikoku limited express services.

Layout
The station comprises a two-story station building with a side platform and an island platform serving three tracks. There is a staffed ticket window with a Midori no Madoguchi which allows passengers to make reservations and buy tickets for JR limited express and shinkansen services. On the ground floor there is a waiting area, cafe, and shop which sells local specialties. Coin lockers and baggage storage facilities are also provided. Parking and a bike shed are available outside the building. A bus station, car rental, bicycle rental are nearby. The station is wheelchair accessible.

From 2009 to 2010, the station underwent a major renovation. This featured the removal of ticket gates, and the remodeling of the waiting area/shop and platform benches in locally sourced Shimanto hinoki wood. The renovation subsequently won multiple design awards including the 2014 Brunel Award and the Japanese Institute of Design Promotion 2010 Good Design Award.

Adjacent stations

History
The station opened on 1 October 1970.

Passenger statistics
In fiscal 2011, the station was used by an average of 1,050 passengers daily.

Surrounding area

See also
 List of railway stations in Japan

References

External links

  

Stations of Tosa Kuroshio Railway
Railway stations in Kōchi Prefecture
Railway stations in Japan opened in 1970
Shimanto, Kōchi (city)